Sue Smith may refer to:

Sue Smith (politician) (born 1951), member of the Tasmanian Legislative Council
Sue Smith (footballer) (born 1979), English footballer
Sue Smith (trainer) (born 1948), British horse trainer
Sue Smith (writer), Australian screenwriter and playwright

See also
Susan Smith (disambiguation)